Paukka may refer to several places in Burma:

 Paukka, Myinmu, Sagaing Region
Paukka, Homalin, Sagaing Region